Alphaguttavirus is a genus of viruses, in the family Guttaviridae. Sulfolobus newzealandicus serve as natural hosts. There is only one species in this genus: Sulfolobus newzealandicus droplet-shaped virus.

Structure
Viruses in the genus Alphaguttavirus are enveloped. The diameter is around 70-95 nm, with a length of 110-185 nm. Genomes are circular, around 20kb in length.

Life cycle
DNA-templated transcription is the method of transcription. Sulfolobus newzealandicus serve as the natural host.

References

External links
 ICTV Online Report Guttaviridae
 Viralzone: Alphaguttavirus

Archaeal viruses
Guttaviridae
Virus genera